Diego Carlos may refer to:

Diego Carlos (footballer, born 1988), Brazilian footballer
Diego Carlos (footballer, born 1993), Brazilian footballer